The La Prevoyante Stakes, until 2019 the La Prevoyante Handicap, is an American Thoroughbred horse race run annually at Gulfstream Park in Hallandale, Florida. The race is open to fillies and mares, age four and up, willing to race one and one-half miles on turf. The Grade III race currently carries a purse of $200,000.

The La Prevoyante Handicap is named for the Hall of Fame filly La Prevoyante, who collapsed and died in the unsaddling area at Calder Race Course after a December 28, 1974 race.

Due to track scheduling changes, the race was run twice in 2011; once in January and again in December.

First run in 1976, there was no race the following year but it returned permanently in 1978. It has been competed at various distances:
 8.5 furlongs ( miles) : 1976
 9 furlongs ( miles) : 1978–1983
 12 furlongs ( miles) : 1984 to present

The race was originally run at Calder Race Course, but was moved to Gulfstream Park beginning in 2014. The purse doubled to $200,000 in 2017.

Records
Speed record: (at current distance of  miles)
 2:25.47 – Herboriste (2008)

Most wins:
 2 – Coretta (1998, 1999)

Winners of the La Prevoyante Handicap since 1998

*Weather conditions resulted in the 2006 race being switched from the turf to what was a sloppy dirt track.

Earlier winners

1997 –  Last Approach
1996 – Ampulla
1995 – Interim
1994 – Abigailthewife, Trampoli
1993 – Lemhi Go
1992 – Sardaniya
1991 – Rigamajig
1990 – Yesterday's Kisses
1989 – Judy's Red Shoes
1988 – Singular Bequest
1987 – Lotka
1986 – Powder Break
1985 – Persian Tiara, Sabin
1984 – Bolt From The Blue, Sabin
1983 – London Lil, Fact Finder
1982 – Judgable Gypsy, Just A Game
1981 – Mairzy Doates, Deuces Over Seven
1980 – Impetuous Gal, Jolie Dutch
1979 – Unreality
1978 – Lens Determined
1976 – Forty Nine Sunsets, Redundancy

References

The La Prevoyante Handicap at Pedigree Query

Graded stakes races in the United States
Long-distance horse races for fillies and mares
Horse races in Florida
Turf races in the United States
Calder Race Course
Recurring sporting events established in 1976
1976 establishments in Florida
Grade 3 stakes races in the United States